Jeremy A. Peterson is an American politician and a Republican member of the Utah House of Representatives representing District 9 since January 1, 2011. Peterson lives in Ogden, Utah, with his wife, Kim, and their four children. He currently works as a real estate broker with Vesta Real Estate.

Education
Peterson earned his BS in marketing from Weber State University.

Political career
Peterson was first elected to the House of Representatives on November 2, 2010.

During the 2016 legislative session, Peterson served on the Business, Economic Development, and Labor Appropriations Subcommittee, the House Law Enforcement and Criminal Justice Committee, and the House Revenue and Taxation Committee.

2016 sponsored legislation 

Peterson did not floor sponsor any bills during the 2016 Legislative Session.

Elections
2014: Peterson was unopposed in the Republican convention and faced Democrat Steve Olsen in the 2014 general election. Peterson won with 2,273 votes (56.9%) to Olsen's 1,721 votes (43.1%).
2012: Peterson and former Democratic Representative Neil Hansen both won their nominations, setting up their third contest; Peterson won the November 6, 2012 general election with 5,079 votes (60.1%) against former Representative Hansen.
2010: Peterson and Representative Hansen both won their nominations, setting up a rematch of their 2008 contest; Peterson won the November 2, 2010 general election with 1,272 votes (53.2%) against Representative Hansen.
2008: To challenge District 9 incumbent Democratic Representative Neil Hansen, Peterson was selected from two candidates by the Republican convention and but lost the November 4, 2008 general election to Representative Hansen.

References

External links
Official page at the Utah State Legislature
Campaign site
Jeremy Peterson at Ballotpedia
Jeremy Peterson at the National Institute on Money in State Politics

Place of birth missing (living people)
Year of birth missing (living people)
Living people
Republican Party members of the Utah House of Representatives
Politicians from Ogden, Utah
Weber State University alumni
21st-century American politicians